Russula erumpens is a species of fungus in the family Russulaceae. It is found in Australia, where it occurs in eucalypt forests and woodlands.

See also
List of Russula species

References

External links

erumpens
Fungi described in 1919
Fungi native to Australia
Taxa named by John Burton Cleland